The Steam carousel is:
a type of carousel

Specific examples of the steam carousel are:
Steam Carousel (Efteling), Netherlands

Steam power